The Fourth Army was a combat command of the National Revolutionary Army involved in the Northern Expedition of the Chinese Civil War. The Fourth Army was commanded by CPC commander Ye Ting.

Northern Expedition
In September, 1925, Ye Ting was appointed regimental commander of the Fourth Army.
In May, 1926, the Fourth Army participated in the advance party of the Northern Expedition. Embarking from Zhaoqing (肇慶), Xinhui (新會), the Fourth Army pushed onwards towards the Hunan front against Northern warlord Wu Peifu.

On June 5, 1926, the independent regiment attacks and occupies Youshen (攸縣城), Hunan (湖南).
On July 20, 1926, the Fourth Army attacks and occupies Liuyang (瀏陽).

On December 25, 1937 the New Fourth Army was established in Hankou, which was named after the late Fourth Army.

Armies of the National Revolutionary Army